Nikola Šutić (born 14 April 1999) is a Serbian footballer who plays as a midfielder for Sloga Bajina Bašta.

Career
Ahead of the 2019–20 season, Šutić joined FK BSK Borča.

Career statistics

References

External links
 
 

1999 births
Living people
Association football midfielders
Serbian footballers
FK Borac Čačak players
FK BSK Borča players
Sportspeople from Čačak
Serbian First League players
FK Tutin players